William Henry Le Feuvre (1832–1896) was an English engineer, born on the island of Jersey. He was president of the Society of Engineers in the United Kingdom, and lent his name to the Ordish-Lefeuvre system for cable-stayed bridges.

References 

English engineers
Jersey people
1832 births
1896 deaths